Oostdijk may refer to:

 Oostdijk (South Holland)
 Oostdijk (Zeeland)